Braziliana may refer to:

Things to do with Brazil
Braziliana, Ballet-musical from Rio de Janeiro 1953 in music
Braziliana (album), by Luiz Bonfa and his wife Maria Toledo 1965
Braziliana, album by Manfredo Fest